The Jacksons is the eleventh studio album by the Jacksons, the band's first album for Epic Records and under the name "the Jacksons," following their seven-year tenure at Motown as "the Jackson 5". Jackson 5 member Jermaine Jackson stayed with Motown when his brothers broke their contracts and left for Epic, and he was replaced by youngest Jackson brother Randy. The album was released in 1976 for Epic Records and Philadelphia International Records as a joint venture.

History

Philadelphia International heads Kenneth Gamble and Leon Huff produced and executive produced the album, including their first top ten hit in two years "Enjoy Yourself", but had a difficult time focusing on a sound for the now-grown-up boy band. However, the group was able for the first time to record their own material, something that had been denied to them at Motown. The Jacksons composed "Style of Life" and "Blues Away" on their own. "Blues Away" was the first published song written by lead singer Michael Jackson, who began to take a more percussive vocal approach beginning with this album. This album also spawned a second successful R&B single, "Show You the Way to Go" (UK no. 1). Though never released as a single, "Good Times" became a popular album cut from regular quiet storm airplay.

The album was the Jacksons' first gold album, despite their having sold more than 10 million albums while at Motown (Motown's sales and financial records were not presented for auditing by the RIAA until 1976).

Track listing

Side One 
 "Enjoy Yourself" (Kenny Gamble, Leon Huff) – 3:24
 "Think Happy" (Kenny Gamble, Leon Huff) – 3:07
 "Good Times" (Kenny Gamble, Leon Huff) – 4:57
 "Keep on Dancing" (Dexter Wansel) – 4:31
 "Blues Away" (Michael Jackson) – 3:12

Side Two 
"Show You the Way to Go" (Kenny Gamble, Leon Huff) – 5:30
"Living Together" (Dexter Wansel) – 4:26
"Strength of One Man" (Gene McFadden, John Whitehead, Victor Carstarphen) – 3:56
"Dreamer" (Kenny Gamble, Leon Huff) – 3:05
"Style of Life" (Tito Jackson, Michael Jackson) – 3:19

Personnel
Lead vocals

Michael leads the tracks 4–6 and 9–10 on his own while he and his brother Jackie lead the vocals on tracks 1–3 and 7. All the brothers (except Tito) sing lead on track 8.

Arrangements
Bobby Martin, Jack Faith, Dexter Wansel

Producers

 1-3, 6, 9 – Kenneth Gamble and Leon Huff
 4, 7 – Dexter Wansel
 5, 10 – Gamble, Huff, Wansel, the Jacksons, Gene McFadden and John Whitehead
 8 – McFadden, Whitehead and Victor Carstarphen

Music
MFSB, Tito Jackson, Randy Jackson

Technical
Jay Mark, Joe Tarsia – mixing
Joe Tarsia – recording
John Berg – album design
Harou Miyauchi – cover drawings
Norman Seeff – photography

Charts

Certifications

References

External links
 The Jacksons – The Jacksons at Discogs

1976 albums
The Jackson 5 albums
Albums produced by Kenneth Gamble
Albums produced by Leon Huff
Albums produced by Michael Jackson
Albums arranged by Bobby Martin
Albums recorded at Sigma Sound Studios
Epic Records albums
Philadelphia International Records albums